= Hydantoic acid =

Names
- IUPAC name N-Carbamoylglycine
- Systematic IUPAC name (Carbamoylamino)acetic acid
- Other names: Ureidoacetic acid; Carbamoylglycine; Glycoluric acid; N-Carbamylglycine; 2-Ureidoacetic acid; [(Aminocarbonyl)amino]acetic acid

Identifiers
CAS Number	462-60-2
3D model (JSmol)	Interactive image
ChEBI	CHEBI:133351
ChemSpider	9626
ECHA InfoCard	100.006.663
EC Number	207-328-5
PubChem CID	10020
UNII	Q4F314U63K
CompTox Dashboard (EPA)	DTXSID7060045
- InChI: InChI=1S/C3H6N2O3/c4-3(8)5-1-2(6)7/h1H2,(H,6,7)(H3,4,5,8) Key: KZVRXPPUJQRGFN-UHFFFAOYSA-N
- SMILES: NC(=O)NCC(O)=O

Properties
Chemical formula	C_{3}H_{6}N_{2}O_{3}
Molar mass	118.092 g·mol^{−1}

Hazards
- GHS labelling
Pictograms	(GHS07: Exclamation mark)
Signal word	Warning
Hazard statements	H302, H315, H319, H335
Precautionary statements	P261, P264, P270, P271, P280, P301+P312, P302+P352, P304+P340, P305+P351+P338, P312, P321, P330, P332+P313, P337+P313, P362, P403+P233, P405, P501
- Except where otherwise noted, data are given for materials in their standard state (at 25 °C [77 °F], 100 kPa). Infobox references

Hydantoic acid is an acid with the chemical formula C_{3}H_{6}N_{2}O_{3}. Its molecule contains a total of 13 bonds including seven non-H bonds, two multiple bonds, two rotatable bonds, two double bonds, one carboxylic acid (aliphatic), one urea derivative, and one hydroxyl group. It can be obtained from uric acid as well as from glycine with urea in the presence of alkali.
